This is a list of artists who have been involved with house music, a genre of electronic dance music. This includes artists who have either been very important to the house music genre or have had a considerable amount of exposure (such as in the case of one who has been on a major label). This list does not include little-known local artists. Groups are listed by the first letter in the group's name (not including the words "a", "an", or "the"), and individuals are listed by first name.

0–9

009 Sound System
20 Fingers
2 Puerto Ricans, a Blackman, and a Dominican
2 Unlimited
49ers
808 State

A

A-Trak
ABC
Adeva
Adonis
Adrenalin M.O.D.
Afrojack
Alec Empire
Alesso
Alex Gaudino
Alex Party
Alexandra Prince
Alexandra Stan
Alison Limerick
Aly-Us
Amber
Angie Brown
Ann Nesby
AnnaGrace
Annie Mac
Anthony Pappa
Antoine Clamaran
Armand Van Helden
Armin van Buuren
Arty
Ashley Beedle
The Aston Shuffle
ATB
The Avalanches
Avicii
Axwell
Aya

B

B.E.D.
B.G., the Prince of Rap
Bad Boy Bill
Bag Raiders
Barbara Tucker
The Basement Boys
Basement Jaxx
Beatmasters
Bellatrax
Benny Benassi
Billie Ray Martin
Bingo Players
Bingoboys
Bizarre Inc
×Black Coffee 
Black Box
Blasterjaxx
Blaze
The Bloody Beetroots
Blue Pearl
Bob Sinclar
BodyRockers
Bomb the Bass
Boogie Pimps
Black Coffee
Booka Shade
Boris Dlugosch
Brooklyn Bounce
Brother Brown
Brothers in Rhythm
BT
Busy P
Byron Stingily

C

C+C Music Factory
Calvin Harris
Cappella
Captain Hollywood Project
Carl Cox
Carol Jiani
Cash Cash
Cassius
The Cataracs
Cathy Dennis
CeCe Peniston
CeCe Rogers
Celeda
The Chainsmokers
Charles Schillings
The Chemical Brothers
Chicane
Chip E.
Chocolate Puma
Chris Brann
Chris Fortier
Chris Lake
Chuckie
Clazziquai
Clean Bandit
CLMD
Club 69
Cobra Starship
Cold Blank
Coldcut
Colonel Abrams
Colton Ford
Corona
Crookers
Crystal Waters
Curtis Jones

D

D Mob
D:Fuse
D:Ream
Da Mob
Dada Life
Dada Nada
Daft Punk
Daisy Dee
Dajae
Daniel Desnoyers
Dannii Minogue
Danny Tenaglia
Darin Epsilon
Daphne Rubin-Vega
Darryl D'Bonneau
Dave Audé
Dave Clarke
David Deejay
David Guetta
David Morales
David Vendetta
Deadmau5
Deborah Cooper
Deborah Cox
Deee-Lite
Deep Dish
Dennis Ferrer
Derrick Carter
Deskee
Dev
Diana King
Dimitri from Paris
Dimitri Vegas & Like Mike
Dina Carroll
Diplo
Dirty South
Dirty Vegas
The Disco Boys
DJ Alligator
DJ Antoine
DJ Colette 
DJ Dan
DJ Disciple
DJ Falcon
DJ Icey
DJ Irene
DJ Jean
DJ Magic Mike
DJ Manian
DJ Pierre
DJ Skribble
DJ Sneak
DJ Spinna
DJ Tonka
DJ Vibe
Donna Allen
Donna Summer
Doug Lazy
Dr. Alban
Dr. Mix
Dream Frequency
Duck Sauce
Dyro

E

East Clubbers
Eddie Amador
Edward Maya
Eric "E-Smoove" Miller
Eric Prydz
Erick Morillo
Etienne de Crécy
Euphoria
Evelyn Thomas
Everything but the Girl

F

Faithless
Farley Jackmaster Funk
Fast Eddie
Fatboy Slim
Fantastic Plastic Machine
Fedde le Grand
Feed me
Felix
Felix da Housecat
Fierce Ruling Diva
François K
Frankie Knuckles
Freak Nasty
Fred Everything
Freemasons
Full Intention
Funkerman

G

Gabrielle
Gaelle
General Levy
Gillette
Gigi D'Agostino
Global Deejays
Graham Stack
Grant Nelson
The Greenskeepers
Greg Stainer
Groove Armada
Gryffin
A Guy Called Gerald
Guy Gerber

H

Haddaway
Hardwell
Havana Brown
Heather Small
Hedkandi
Hercules and Love Affair
Hernán Cattáneo
Hyper Crush

I

Ian Carey
Ian Pooley
Icona Pop
iiO
Inaya Day
India
Inna
Inner City
Ivan Gough

J

Jam & Spoon
James Holden
Jamie Principle
Jaydee
Jay-J
Jeffree Star
Jellybean 
Jersey Street
Jerome Sydenham
Jesse Saunders
Jimpster
Jocelyn Brown
Jocelyn Enriquez
Joey Beltram
Joey Negro
John Creamer & Stephane K
John Digweed
John Dahlback
Joi Cardwell
Jomanda
Jonathan Peters
Jori Hulkkonen
Josh Wink
JS16
Juliet Roberts
Junior Jack
Junior Sanchez
Junior Vasquez
Junkie XL
Justice

K

Kaskade
Katalina
Kavinsky
Kaz James
Kelly Llorenna
Kenny "Dope" Gonzalez
Kerri Chandler
Kevin Aviance
Kiesza
Kill the Noise
Killer Bunnies
Kim English
King Britt
K-Klass
The KLF
Klubbheads
Knife Party
Kosmik Kommando
Krewella
Kristine W
Kym Mazelle
Kygo

L

La Bouche
Larry Levan
Laidback Luke
Larry Heard
Laurent Garnier
Laurent Wolf
Late Night Alumni
Lazy Dog
Le Click
Leftfield
Le Knight Club
Lenny Fontana
Lil Louis
Linda Clifford
Lisa Shaw
Little Louie Vega
Livin' Joy
Liz Torres
LMFAO
Loleatta Holloway
Lone
Lonnie Gordon
Louis La Roche
Love Inc.
Luciana

M

M People
Madeon
Madison Avenue
Madison Park
Magic Affair
Marc Mysterio
Mark Dynamix
Mark Farina
Mark Picchiotti
Mark Summers
MARRS
Marshall Jefferson
Marshmello
Martha Wash
Martin Garrix
Martin Solveig
Marusha
Masters At Work
Matthew Dear
Mauro Picotto
MC Mario
Melanie Williams
Melleefresh
Metro Area
Michael Gray
Michael Watford
Michelle Visage
Miguel Migs
Mihalis Safras
Mike Perras
Mike Williams
Milk & Sugar
Milton Jackson
Moguai
Moloko
Mondo Grosso
Monica Hughes
Monika Kruse
Morgan King
Morgan Page
Mousse T.
Mr. Oizo
Mstrkrft
Murk (also performed as Funky Green Dogs)
Mylo

N-O

Nadia Ali
Nadirah Shakoor
Narcotic Thrust
Nervo
Nicky Romero
Nightcrawlers
Niki Haris
Noisia
Nomad
N-Joi
N-Trance
Oceanic
Olav Basoski
Offer Nissim
One-T
Ookay
Opus III
Otto Knows

P-Q

Paul Johnson
Paul Oakenfold
Paul Taylor
Paul Van Dyk
Pepper MaShay
Pete Heller
Pete Tong
Peter Rauhofer
Pet Shop Boys
Phuture
Phuturistix
Planet Funk
Planet Soul
Porter Robinson
Princessa
Quentin Harris

R

R3hab
Rachel McFarlane
Ralphi Rosario
Raze
Real McCoy
Rebecca & Fiona
RedOne
Regi Penxten
Réjane Magloire
Richard Vission
Robbie Rivera
Robin S.
Robert Miles 
The Roc Project
Roger Sanchez
Ron Hardy
Roy Davis Jr.
Rudenko
Rui da Silva
Rune RK
RuPaul

S

S'Express
Sabrina Johnston
Sabrynaah Pope
Saint Etienne
Samantha James
Sander Kleinenberg
Sander van Doorn
Sandy B
Sasha
Savant
Seamus Haji
Sebastian Ingrosso
Sébastien Léger
Selan
Shakedown
The Shamen
Shapeshifters
Shawn Christopher
Shep Pettibone
Showtek
Sidney Samson
Silicone Soul
Skrillex
Slam
Slushii
Sonique
Soul II Soul
Soul For Real
Spiller
Stacey Pullen
Star Tattooed
Stardust
Static Revenger
Staxx of Joy
Stephanie Cooke
Steps
Stereo MC's
Steve "Silk" Hurley
Steve Angello
Steve Aoki
Steve Lawler
Steve Porter
Steve Stoll
StoneBridge
Stromae
Superchumbo
Su Su Bobien
Sunscreem
Supermen Lovers
Supermode
Sussie 4
Sven Väth
Swayzak
Swedish House Mafia
Swirl People

T

Taylor Dayne
Technotronic
Telepopmusic
Ten City
Theo Keating
Theo Parrish
The Timelords
Thunderpuss
Tiefschwarz
Tiësto
Tiga
Timmy Regisford
Timmy Trumpet
Timo Maas
Tin Tin Out
Tocadisco
Todd Edwards
Todd Terry
Tom Middleton
Tommy Trash
Tom Novy
Tom Taped
Tom Wilson
Tony Hewitt
Tony Humphries
The Toxic Avenger
Trentemøller
TV Rock

U-V

Ultrabeat
Ultra Naté
Uppermost
Underworld
Ursula Rucker
Utah Saints
Vanessa Daou
Vernessa Mitchell
Vicetone
Victor Calderone
Vika Jigulina

W-X-Y-Z

Way Out West
Whirlpool Productions
Wolfgang Gartner
X-Press 2
Ya Kid K
Yves Larock
Yves Deruyter
Yinon Yahel
Zelma Davis
Zedd

See also

Lists of musicians
List of club DJs
List of electro house artists
List of progressive house artists

References

House musicians
House music
House